Patricia Norton (20 March 1919 – 2 September 2007), later known by her married name Patricia Down, was an Australian backstroke swimmer. She competed in the 1936 Summer Olympics and was eliminated in the semi-finals of the 100-metre backstroke event. At the 1938 Empire Games she won the gold medal in the 110-yard backstroke competition.  She also won a silver medal with the Australian team in the 4×110-yard freestyle relay contest and a bronze medal in the 3×110-yard medley relay event.

References

1919 births
2007 deaths
Australian female backstroke swimmers
Australian female freestyle swimmers
Olympic swimmers of Australia
Swimmers at the 1936 Summer Olympics
Swimmers at the 1938 British Empire Games
Commonwealth Games gold medallists for Australia
Commonwealth Games silver medallists for Australia
Commonwealth Games bronze medallists for Australia
Commonwealth Games medallists in swimming
20th-century Australian women
Medallists at the 1938 British Empire Games